Bob Kressig (born December 31, 1953, in Dubuque, Iowa) is the Iowa State Representative from the 59th District. He has served in the Iowa House of Representatives since January 2005.

Kressig currently serves on several committees in the Iowa House – the Environmental Protection committee; the Public Safety committee; the Commerce committee, where he is vice chair; and the Local Government committee, where he is vice chair.  He also serves on the Administration and Regulation Appropriations Subcommittee.

Electoral history 
Kressig was re-elected in 2006 with 5,171 votes (50%), defeating Republican opponent Matt Reisetter.

In 2010 Kressig was re-elected to the Iowa House of Representatives District 19 defeating Republican Darin Beck
Bob Kressig (D) (5550 votes) (52.12%)
Darin Beck (R) (5066 votes) (47.58%)
write in (32 votes) (0.3%)

Because of redistricting, most of House District 19 was renamed House District 59.  Kressig won election for House District 59 in the 2012 general election.

Early life and education
Kressig attended Sacred Heart Catholic School, Columbus High School and in 1972 graduated from Waterloo West High. After graduating high school. he started working at John Deere.

Career
Outside politics Kressig spent 31 years working for John Deere where he retired in 2003.

Organizations
Kressig is or has been a member of the following of organizations:
 Veridian Credit Union Board
 Planning and Zoning Commission of Cedar Falls
 Cedar Valleys Promise Policy Board
 University of Northern Iowa's Metal Casting Center Board of Directors
 North Star Community Services Board of Directors
 Senior Coordinating Living Unit in Des Moines.
 UAW Local 838 retirees group
 Cedar Falls Lions Club
 Cedar Valley Cyclists, formerly Rainbow Cyclists, in Cedar Falls, Waterloo, and surrounding area
 Nazareth Lutheran Church, in Cedar Falls

Family
Kressig is the son of Bob and Verdie Kressig and he has two sisters, Kudy Beckmann and Peggy Kane. Kressig married his wife Liz in 1978. Together they have two daughters, Molly and Laura and two grandchildren, Brianna and Gavin. Kressig and his wife live in Cedar Falls, Iowa.

References

External links
 Bob Kressig at Iowa Legislature
 Kressig's campaign website
 Kressig on Project Vote Smart

Democratic Party members of the Iowa House of Representatives
Living people
Place of birth missing (living people)
1953 births
21st-century American politicians